The 1914 Burdur earthquake (also called the Afyon-Bolvadin earthquake) occurred at 00:07 local time (22:07 UTC) on 4 October. It was estimated to be 7.0 on the surface wave magnitude scale with a maximum intensity of IX (Violent) on the Mercalli intensity scale. It was centered near Lake Burdur in southwestern Anatolia and the mainshock and subsequent fire destroyed more than 17,000 homes, and caused 2,344 casualties.

Earthquake
The earthquake, along with several others in 1959 and 1971, occurred along the Fethiye-Burdur fault zone, a parallel and discontinuous series of fault segments.

Damage
In Burdur nearly all homes were destroyed along with other significant and historical monuments. Kilinc was destroyed and in Keciborlu around 85 percent of the houses were lost. In the city of Isparta the great Mosque was destroyed along with more than half of the homes.

See also
 List of earthquakes in 1914
 List of earthquakes in Turkey

References

External links

1914 Burdur
1914 in the Ottoman Empire
1914
Afyon-Bolvadin
1914 disasters in Asia
1914 disasters in the Ottoman Empire